The enzyme hydroperoxide dehydratase catalyzes the chemical reaction

(9Z,11E,14Z)-(13S)-hydroperoxyoctadeca-9,11,14-trienoate  (9Z)-(13S)-12,13-epoxyoctadeca-9,11-dienoate + H2O

This enzyme belongs to the family of lyases, specifically the hydro-lyases, which cleave carbon-oxygen bonds.  The systematic name of this enzyme class is (9Z,11E,14Z)-(13S)-hydroperoxyoctadeca-9,11,14-trienoate 12,13-hydro-lyase [(9Z)-(13S)-12,13-epoxyoctadeca-9,11-dienoate-forming]. Other names in common use include hydroperoxide isomerase, linoleate hydroperoxide isomerase, linoleic acid hydroperoxide isomerase, HPI, (9Z,11E,14Z)-(13S)-hydroperoxyoctadeca-9,11,14-trienoate, and 12,13-hydro-lyase.

Structural studies

As of late 2007, only one structure has been solved for this class of enzymes, with the PDB accession code .

References

 
 
 

EC 4.2.1
Enzymes of known structure